IBZ may refer to:

 Ibiza Airport
 International Bibliography of Periodical Literature (Internationale Bibliographie der Zeitschriftenliteratur)
 International Business Air (ICAO code), an airline
 Irreducible Brillouin zone